In macroeconomics, chartalism is a heterodox theory of money that argues that money originated historically with states' attempts to direct economic activity rather than as a spontaneous solution to the problems with barter or as a means with which to tokenize debt, and that fiat currency has value in exchange because of sovereign power to levy taxes on economic activity payable in the currency they issue.

Background
George Friedrich Knapp, a German economist, invented the term "chartalism" in his State Theory of Money, which was published in German in 1905 and translated into English in 1924. The name derives from the Latin charta, in the sense of a token or ticket. Knapp argued that "money is a creature of law" rather than a commodity. Knapp contrasted his state theory of money with "metallism", as embodied at the time in the gold standard, where the value of a unit of currency depended on the quantity of precious metal it contained or could be exchanged for. He argued the state could create pure paper money and make it exchangeable by recognising it as legal tender, with the criterion for the money of a state being "that which is accepted at the public pay offices".

When Knapp was writing, the prevailing view of money was that it had evolved from systems of barter to become a medium of exchange because it represented a durable commodity which had some use value. However, as modern chartalist economists such as Randall Wray and Mathew Forstater have pointed out, chartalist insights into tax-driven paper money can be found in the earlier writings of many classical economists, for instance Adam Smith, who observed in The Wealth of Nations:

Forstater also finds support for the concept of tax-driven money, under certain institutional conditions, in the work of Jean-Baptiste Say, John Stuart Mill, Karl Marx and William Stanley Jevons.

Alfred Mitchell-Innes, writing in 1914, argued that money existed not as a medium of exchange but as a standard of deferred payment, with government money being debt the government could reclaim by taxation. Innes argued:

Knapp and "Chartalism" were referenced by John Maynard Keynes in the opening pages of his 1930 Treatise on Money  and appear to have influenced Keynesian ideas on the role of the state in the economy. By 1947, when Abba Lerner wrote his article "Money as a Creature of the State", economists had largely abandoned the idea that the value of money was closely linked to gold. Lerner argued that responsibility for avoiding inflation and depressions lay with the state because of its ability to create or tax away money.

Historian Constantina Katsari sees principles from both metallism and chartalism reflected in the monetary system introduced by Augustus to the eastern provinces of the Roman Empire, from the early 1st century to the late 3rd century AD.

Modern proponents

Economists Warren Mosler, L. Randall Wray, Stephanie Kelton, and Bill Mitchell are largely responsible for reviving chartalism as an explanation of money creation; Wray refers to this revived formulation as Neo-Chartalism.

Mitchell, founder of the Centre of Full Employment and Equity or CofFEE at the University of Newcastle in Australia, coined the term Modern Monetary Theory to describe modern Neo-Chartalism, and that term is now widely used. Scott Fullwiler has added detailed technical analysis of the banking and monetary systems.

Rodger Malcolm Mitchell's book Free Money describes in layman's terms the essence of chartalism.

Some contemporary proponents, such as Wray, situate chartalism within post-Keynesian economics, while chartalism has been proposed as an alternative or complementary theory to monetary circuit theory, both being forms of endogenous money, i.e., money created within the economy, as by government deficit spending or bank lending, rather than from outside, as by gold. In the complementary view, chartalism explains the "vertical" (government-to-private and vice versa) interactions, while circuit theory is a model of the "horizontal" (private-to-private) interactions.

Hyman Minsky seemed to incorporate a Chartalist approach to money creation in his Stabilizing an Unstable Economy, while Basil Moore, in his book Horizontalists and Verticalists, delineates the differences between bank money and state money.

James K. Galbraith supports chartalism and wrote the foreword for Mosler's book Seven Deadly Innocent Frauds of Economic Policy in 2010.

See also 
 Functional finance
 Demand for money
 History of money
 History of macroeconomic thought
 Fiat currency

References 

Monetary economics
Macroeconomic theories